Gina Alice Stiebitz (born October 1997) is a German actress. She is best known for portraying Franziska Doppler in the Netflix show Dark. She has also appeared in a number of stage productions, primarily at the Friedrichstadt-Palast theatre in Berlin.

Biography
Stiebitz began her acting career in 2010 with a part in the Benedek Fliegauf movie Womb and in the television series Wie erziehe ich meine Eltern?  A year later, she played Juliane Noak in the series In aller Freundschaft. In 2016, Stiebitz appeared in the television shows Familie Dr. Kleist and Großstadtrevier. She achieved international recognition in 2017 for her portrayal of Franziska Doppler, a young rebel who has a strained relationship with her parents and wants to escape from the town where she lives, in the Netflix series Dark. She reprised the role in the second and third seasons of Dark.

Filmography

References

External links
 

1997 births
Living people
German television actresses
21st-century German actresses
Actresses from Berlin